Lord Charles Vere Ferrers Townshend (16 September 1785 – 5 November 1853), was a British politician.

Townshend was the second son of George Townshend, 2nd Marquess Townshend, and his wife Charlotte (née Loftus). He was returned to Parliament as one of two representatives for Tamworth in 1812, a seat he held until 1818, and again between 1820 and 1835.  He was initially elected in the family interest, when his family owned Tamworth Castle, but could not expect to continue in 1818 after the Townshend trustees had sold the castle, but was defeated when Sir Robert Peel, 1st Baronet, the owner of Drayton Manor in nearby Drayton Bassett and his son William canvassed against him.  However he was re-elected unopposed in 1820.

Townshend died in November 1853, aged 68, having previously repurchased Tamworth Castle.

Notes

References
Kidd, Charles, Williamson, David (editors). Debrett's Peerage and Baronetage (1990 edition). New York: St Martin's Press, 1990, 

History of Parliament

External links 
 

1785 births
1853 deaths
Members of the Parliament of the United Kingdom for English constituencies
Charles Townshend
UK MPs 1812–1818
UK MPs 1830–1831
UK MPs 1831–1832
UK MPs 1832–1835
Younger sons of marquesses
Non-inheriting heirs presumptive